Pak Khlong Talat is a market in Wang Burapha Phirom Subdistrict, Phra Nakhon District, Bangkok, Thailand, that sells flowers, fruits, and vegetables. It is the primary flower market of Bangkok and has been cited as a "place of symbolic value" to Bangkok residents. It is on Chak Phet Road and adjacent side-streets, close to Memorial Bridge. Though the market is open 24 hours, it is busiest before dawn, when boats and trucks arrive with flowers from nearby provinces. Its location by Chao Phraya River near the southern end of Khlong Lot, hence the name 'Pak Khlong Talat', literally means "the market on the mouth of the canal".

History
During the reign of Rama I (1782–1809), the site was a floating market. By the reign of Rama V (1868–1910), it had become a fish market.  The fish market was eventually converted to today's produce market, which has existed for over 60 years. The market's focus has shifted from produce to flowers as the Talat Thai market on the outskirts of Bangkok has become a more attractive site for produce wholesaling.

Most of the flowers sold in the market are delivered from Nakhon Pathom, Samut Sakhon, and Samut Songkhram Provinces, though flowers that require cooler growing temperatures may come from as far away as Chiang Mai or Chiang Rai. The market's produce selection is extensive and is delivered from across the country.

The market accommodates both consumers and wholesalers and has a wide variety of customers. Many local florists visit the market in the early morning hours to stock their shops for the coming day. The urban poor who make a living stringing and selling phuang malai (flower garlands) buy sacks of jasmine and marigold blossoms. Though the market is documented in guidebooks, it receives few foreign tourists.

In 2016, outdoor vendors at Pak Khlong Talat were forced to move indoors.

Transportation
The market is served by BMTA bus lines: 1, 2, 3, 7ก, 8, 9, 12, 33, 42, 47, 53, 60, 73, 73ก, 82 

It is close to Sanam Chai Station on the MRT's Blue Line, as well as having access to three piers of the Chao Phraya Express Boat: Memorial Bridge (N6), Yodpiman (N6/1), and Rajini (N7)

References

Retail markets in Bangkok
Food markets
Flower markets
Buildings and structures on the Chao Phraya River
Phra Nakhon district